Carina Witthöft was the defending champion, but chose not to participate.

Antonia Lottner won the title, defeating Tereza Smitková in the final, 3–6, 7–5, 6–3.

Seeds

Main draw

Finals

Top half

Bottom half

References 
 Main draw

Reinert Open - Singles
Reinert Open